The 1880–81 Irish Cup was the inaugural edition of the premier knock-out cup competition in Irish football. The competition began on 5 February 1881 with the first round and ended on 9 April 1881 with the final. Moyola Park were the first winners of the competition, and they have never won it since.

The competition was played in a straight knock-out format. If a match ended level at full time, a replay was required to decide the winner. The very first Irish Cup replay was between Cliftonville and Knock on 26 March 1881. William Morrow of Moyola Park scored the very first goal in an Irish Cup final during his club's 1–0 win over Cliftonville to lift the trophy.

Results

First round
The draw for the first round was made on 10 January 1881, with the matches played on Saturday, 5 February 1881. Alexander received a bye into the semi-finals as a result of the odd number of seven participants.

|-

|}

Semi-finals
The 3 first round winners entered this round, along with Alexander. The matches took place on Saturday, 12 March 1881.

|-

|}

Replay
The match took place on Saturday, 26 March 1881.

|-

|}

Final
The inaugural Irish Cup final was played on 9 April 1881 at the Cliftonville Cricket Ground, Belfast in front of 1,500 spectators.

References

External links
 Northern Ireland Cup Finals. Rec.Sport.Soccer Statistics Foundation (RSSSF)

1880–81
Cup
1880–81 domestic association football cups